Leanne Hall is an Australian author of young adult and children's fiction.

Hall's debut novel This is Shyness won the Text Prize for Young Adult and Children's Writing (2009). Her novel Iris and the Tiger won the Patricia Wrightson Prize for Children's Literature (2017). Her most recent novel, The Gaps, won the Davitt Award for Best Young Adult Novel, Adelaide Festival Award for Literature: Young Adult Fiction, Ethel Turner Prize for Young People's Literature, and Prime Minister's Literary Award for Young Adult.

Biography 
In 2013, Hall was an Asialink Artist in Residence at Peking University. In 2014, she participated in Australian Writers Week in China.

Hall is currently completing a Ph.D. in Ultra Running at RMIT University.

Awards and honors 
Iris and the Tiger was selected for The White Ravens Catalogue (2017).

In 2022, Kirkus Reviews named The Gaps one of the best young adult novels of the year.

Publications 
Hall's short stories have been published in Meanjin, The Age, Best Australian Stories, Sleepers Almanac, Kill Your Darlings, and Growing Up Asian In Australia.

Standalone books 

 Iris and the Tiger (2016)
 The Gaps (2022)

Shyness series 

 This Is Shyness (2010)
 Queen of the Night (2012)

References

External links 

 Official website

Australian children's writers
21st-century Australian writers
21st-century Australian women writers
Year of birth missing (living people)
Living people